KF Kamjani (FK Kamjan) is a football club based in the village of Kamjan near Tetovo, North Macedonia. They are currently competing in the Macedonian Third League (West Division).

History
The club was founded in 1978.

References

External links
Kamjani Facebook 
Club info at MacedonianFootball 
Football Federation of Macedonia 

Kamjani
Association football clubs established in 1978
1978 establishments in the Socialist Republic of Macedonia
Bogovinje Municipality
Kamjani